Loves Only You (foaled 26 March 2016) is a Japanese Thoroughbred racehorse. She showed promise as a two-year-old when she won both her races. In the following spring she took the Wasurenagusa Sho before extending her unbeaten run to four by winning the Yushun Himba in record time. She sustained he first defeat in November 2019 when she ran third in the Queen Elizabeth II Cup. She failed to win in five starts as a four-year-old in 2020, but returned to her best form in 2021 when she won the Kyoto Kinen, Queen Elizabeth II Cup, the Breeders' Cup Filly & Mare Turf in the United States and the Hong Kong Cup. She was awarded an Eclipse Award as the American Champion Female Turf Horse for 2021.

Background
Loves Only You is a bay mare with a short white blaze and a white socks on her left hind and forelegs bred in Hokkaido by Northern Farm. As a yearling in 2017 he was consigned to the Select Sale and was bought for ¥172,800,000 by DMM.com Co Ltd. She was sent into training with Yoshito Yahagi.

She was from the ninth crop of foals sired by Deep Impact, who was the Japanese Horse of the Year in 2005 and 2006, winning races including the Tokyo Yushun, Tenno Sho, Arima Kinen and Japan Cup. Deep Impact's other progeny include Gentildonna, Harp Star, Kizuna, A Shin Hikari, Marialite and Saxon Warrior. Loves Only You's dam Loves Only Me, a half-sister to Rumplestiltskin, was trained in Ireland but never raced and was exported to Japan after being sold for $900,000 at Keeneland in November 2009. She was a granddaughter of the outstanding racehorse and broodmare Miesque. Loves Only Me has also produced Loves Only You's full brother Real Steel.

Racing career

2018: two-year-old season
On 3 November at Kyoto Racecourse Loves Only You began her track career in an event for previously unraced juveniles over 1800 metres and won from Arden Forest. Twenty-two days later at the same track the filly started the 1.3/1 favourite for the Shiragiku Sho over 1600 metres in which she was ridden by Yasunari Iwata and won by one and three quarter lengths from Rambling Alley.

2019: three-year-old season
Loves Only You made her three-year-old debut in the Listed Wasurenagusa Sho over 2000 metres at Hanshin Racecourse on 7 April in which she was ridden by Mirco Demuro. Despite starting badly and meeting with interference she produced a strong late run and won by three lengths. Demuro later commented "It was an easy win... She got bumped a bit at the break and got upset and clamped down on the bit until the first turn. But, she's a very clever horse and calmed right down".

On 19 May Loves Only You was stepped up in class and distance for the Grade 1 Yushun Himba over 2400 metres at Tokyo Racecourse in which she was partnered by Demuro and started the 3/1 favourite. Second choice in the betting was Chrono Genesis (winner of the Daily Hai Queen Cup) while the other sixteen runners included Contra Check (Flower Cup), Danon Fantasy, Shigeru Pink Dia (runner-up in the Oka Sho), Victoria (Flora Stakes), Schon Glanz (Artemis Stakes), Figlia Pura (Fairy Stakes) and No One (Fillies' Revue). The outsider Jodie set the pace from Contra Check and Aile Voix while Loves Only You raced in mid division before moving to the outside to make her challenge in the straight. Curren Bouquetd'or went to the front approaching the last 400 metres but Loves Only You produced a sustained run on the outside to gain the advantage in the final strides and win by a neck with two and a half lengths back to Chrono Genesis in third. The winning time of 2:22.8 was a new race record. After the race Demuro said "I was a bit worried at the final corner since we were in a lower position than planned, but she showed an incredible burst of speed and stretched beautifully. She has a heart of steel".

It was intended to bring Loves Only You back in autumn for the Shuka Sho but she missed the race after being found to have an inflamed tendon. The filly eventually made her comeback in the Grade 1 Queen Elizabeth II Cup when she was matched against older fillies and mares for the first time. Starting the 1.5/1 favourite she raced in second place for most of the way but was unable to quicken in the straight and came home third behind Lucky Lilac and the front-running Crocosmia.

In January 2020, at the JRA Awards for 2019, Loves Only You finished runner-up to Gran Alegria in the poll to determine the JRA Award for Best Three-Year-Old Filly, taking 99 of the 274 votes.

2020: four-year-old season
In the spring of 2020 Loves Only You was sent to Meydan Racecourse in Dubai to contest the Sheema Classic in March, but the meeting was abandoned owing to the COVID-19 pandemic. The filly returned to Japan and made her 2020 debut on 17 May when she started 8.5/1 third choice in the betting for the Victoria Mile at Tokyo, but after racing in mid-division she struggled to obtain a clear run and came home seventh behind Almond Eye and Sound Chiara. The filly dropped to Grade 3 class and matched against male opponents in the Naruo Kinen over 2000 metres at Hanshin on 6 June when she started the 0.8/1 favourite but was beaten a nose by the eight-year-old Perform A Promise.

After a five month break Loves Only You returned to the track at Tokyo in October and finished fifth behind Salacia when favourite for the Grade 2 Fuchu Himba Stakes over 1800 metres. On 15 November the filly started the 4.5/1 third choice for the Queen Elizabeth II Cup over 2200 metres at Hanshin. After racing in eleventh place she produced a strong late run on the outside and finished third behind Lucky Lilac and Salacia, beaten half a length by the winner. The filly ended her season in the Arima Kinen over 2500 metres at Nakayama Racecourse when she started the 14.5/1 sixth choice in the betting and came home tenth of the sixteen runners behind Chrono Genesis, beaten six lengths by the winner.

Offspring
Loves Only You gave birth to her first foal in Japan on February 27, 2023. The foal is a colt by Shadai Stallion Station's Epiphaneia, the 2014 Japan Cup  victor and an earner of more than US$6 million who has sired Japanese grade 1 winners Daring Tact, Efforia (JPN), and Circle of Life. He stood the 2022 season for ¥18,000,000 (US$131,997).

Pedigree

References

2016 racehorse births
Racehorses bred in Japan
Racehorses trained in Japan
Thoroughbred family 20
Breeders' Cup Filly & Mare Turf winners